Once in a Lifetime is a 1932 American pre-Code comedy film based on Once in a Lifetime by George S. Kaufman and Moss Hart. The film was produced and distributed by Universal Pictures, directed by Russell Mack and stars Jack Oakie, Sidney Fox and Aline MacMahon.
 
It is preserved at the Library of Congress.

Plot
The immense success of The Jazz Singer, the first all-talking picture, results in the cancellation of a booking for three song-and-dance vaudeville performers: Jerry Hyland, May Daniels and George Lewis. Jerry, convinced that talkies are the future, decides they will head to Hollywood to break into the fledgling movie industry before others get the same notion. May comes up with the idea to open a school of elocution to teach actors how to speak on film. On the train there, May encounters an old friend, Helen Hobart, an influential, nationally syndicated columnist. She offers to put them in touch with Herman Glogauer, the head of a major movie studio. George is smitten with another passenger, aspiring young actress Susan Walker.

They discover the movie world to be an eccentric place. George is unexpectedly appointed by Glogauer as supervisor of production, allowing him to promote Susan's career. Despite his incompetence (or rather because of it), his first picture turns out to be a critical and commercial smash hit, and Susan becomes a star.

Later, a very persuasive salesman gets George to buy 2000 airplanes, which causes Glogauer to fire him. However, air movies become very popular, and George has inadvertently cornered the market. The other studios are desperate to get airplanes from Glogauer at any price, and George is once again considered a genius.

Cast

Jack Oakie as George Lewis
Sidney Fox as Susan Walker
Aline MacMahon as May Daniels
Russell Hopton as Jerry Hyland
Louise Fazenda as Helen Hobart
ZaSu Pitts as Miss Leighton
Gregory Ratoff as Herman Glogauer
Jobyna Howland as Mrs. Walker
Onslow Stevens as Lawrence Vail
Gregory Gaye as Rudolph Kammerling
Eddie Kane as Meterstein
Johnnie Morris as Weiskopf
Frank LaRue as The Bishop
Margaret Lindsay as Dr. Lewis' Secretary
Alan Ladd as Projectionist (uncredited)
Mona Maris as Phyllis Fontaine (uncredited)

Reception
Mordaunt Hall, film critic of The New York Times, gave the film a favorable review, calling it a "merry diversion". He praised all the main performers, as well as ZaSu Pitts as the studio's obtuse receptionist.

References

External links
Once in a Lifetime at IMDb.com
allmovie/synopsis; Once in a Lifetime
lobby poster, rare

1932 comedy films
1932 films
American black-and-white films
American comedy films
Films about filmmaking
American films based on plays
Films directed by Russell Mack
Films set in Los Angeles
Universal Pictures films
1930s American films